Laércio da Silva Carvalho (born 17 November 1998), commonly known as Laércio, is a Brazilian footballer who currently plays as a midfielder for Cruzeiro.

Career statistics

Club

Notes

References

1998 births
Living people
Brazilian footballers
Association football midfielders
Salgueiro Atlético Clube players
Cruzeiro Esporte Clube players
Ipatinga Futebol Clube players
Campeonato Brasileiro Série A players